Reginald (known as Rex) Armstrong OBE (6 December 1897, Newcastle upon Tyne – 17 February 1968, Morpeth) was a rugby union international  prop who represented England in one international during 1925.

Armstrong was educated at the Newcastle University Medical School. He played for Durham Medicals, Northumberland and the Barbarians. During World War II he served with the RAMC and was awarded the OBE in 1944.
In 1967 he became the first doctor to describe Foot-and-mouth disease in man in the UK.

References

1897 births
1968 deaths
Rugby union players from Newcastle upon Tyne
Alumni of Newcastle University
England international rugby union players
Royal Army Medical Corps officers
Officers of the Order of the British Empire
British Army personnel of World War II
Military personnel from Newcastle upon Tyne